The UCI Track Cycling World Championships – Women's sprint is the world championship sprint event held annually at the UCI Track Cycling World Championships. Galina Yermolayeva and Galina Tsareva of the Soviet Union, and Victoria Pendleton of Great Britain have each won this event on six occasions, the most by any cyclist.

Medalists

Medal table

See also
UCI Track Cycling World Championships – Women's keirin
UCI Track Cycling World Championships – Men's sprint

External links
Track Cycling World Championships 2016–1893 bikecult.com
World Championship, Track, Sprint, Elite cyclingarchives.com
Results from Cyclebase.nl

 
Women's sprint
Lists of UCI Track Cycling World Championships medalists